
Priory Church is the name of many Christian churches which have had a connection with a priory.  

Examples (arranged by order of country, then place-name) include:

France
 Saint-Michel de Grandmont Priory, Saint-Privat, Hérault

Spain
 Priory Church, El Puerto de Santa María

United Kingdom
When monasteries were closed in the Protestant Reformation of the sixteenth century, the churches were often given a new role as parish churches.  At Oxford a priory church became the city's cathedral. 

While priory churches are usually associated with former priories rather than active priories, a few priories have been constructed since the Reformation, for example St Dominic's Priory Church.

 Priory Church of St Mary, Abergavenny
 St Mary's Church, Bungay
 Bridlington Priory
 Cartmel Priory
 Christchurch Priory
 Dunstable Priory
 Edington Priory
 Priory Church of St George, Dunster
 Lancaster Priory
 Priory Church of St. Anthony, Lenton
 Priory Church, Leominster
 St Bartholomew-the-Great, London
 St Dominic's Priory Church, London
 Clerkenwell Priory (Priory Church of St John of Jerusalem), London
 Oxford Cathedral (Priory Church of St Frideswide)
Priory of St. Andrews of the Ards, Stogursey
 Priory Church of St. Peter, Thurgarton

See also
List of English abbeys, priories and friaries serving as parish churches